Sir Lionel Tollemache, 1st Baronet (1562 – 1612), the son of Lionel Tollemache of Helmingham, Suffolk and Susanna Jermyn, served twice as Sheriff of Suffolk, in 1593 and 1609, and was knighted in 1612.

Biography
He was the only son and heir of Lionel Tollemache (1545 – 11 Dec 1575) of Helmingham, and Susanna, daughter of Sir Ambrose Jermyn of Rushbrooke in Suffolk. He was baptised on 14 December 1562 at Helmingham.

He was Sheriff of Suffolk in 1593, again in 1609, and was amongst the first batch of baronets created on the institution of the order by James I in 1611. On 22 May 1611 he was created a baronet of Helmingham, and was subsequently knighted at the Palace of Whitehall on 24 May 1612.

Marriage and children
On 10 February 1581 at North Elmham, he married Katharine (d.1621), daughter of Henry Cromwell, 2nd Baron Cromwell and Mary, daughter of John Paulet, 2nd Marquess of Winchester, by whom he had several children, including:
Sir Lionel Tollemache, 2nd Baronet (1591-1640), son and heir.
Robert Tollemache (born 1592) married Dorothy, daughter of John Lane in Staffordshire.
Edward Tollemache (baptised 20 June 1596)
Susan Tollemache married Sir Henry Doily of Shottisham.
Mary Tollemache
Katherine Tollemache
Anne Tollemache, married Robert Gosnold (V)

Death
He died in 1612 and was buried at Helmingham, "his effigy, in richly gilt armour, being placed by itself on the great tomb in the church there". Above the kneeling figure of Sir Lionel are the Tollemache arms, with the arms of Cromwell, and beneath the lines:Here with his Fathers sleeps Sr LyonellKnight Barronet all Honors worthy wellSo well ye acts of all his life exprestHis elders vertues and excel'd their besteHis prudent bearing in his publique placeSuff. high Shireve twice in 16 yeeres space.His Zeale to God and towards ill seventieHis temperance his Justice his sinceritieHis native mildnesse towards great and smallHis Faith and Love to Frends wife children allIn life and death made him belov'd and deere
To God and men. Happy in heaven and heere.Happy in soule in body goods and nameHappy in wedlock with a noble DameLord Cromwells Daughter happie in his heireWhose spring of vertues sprouts so yong, so faireWhos deere affection to his Founders' debtorBuilt them this toomb, but in his hart a better.

His widow, who outlived him by eight years, died on 24 March 1621 and was buried at Helmingham, where there is a marble tablet over the chancel door of the church erected to her memory.

Notes

References

External links
 St Mary's church Helmingham Suffolk Tollemache memorial
 TOLLEMACHE (TALMASH), Sir Lionel, 2nd Bt. (1591-1640), of Helmingham Hall, Suff.; Brunt Hall, Great Fakenham, Suff. and Charing Cross, Westminster. In Thrush, Andrew; Ferris, John P. (eds.). The History of Parliament: the House of Commons 1604–1629.

Baronets in the Baronetage of England
1562 births
1612 deaths
High Sheriffs of Suffolk
16th-century English people
17th-century English people
Lionel Tollemache, 1st Baronet of Helmingham
People from Mid Suffolk District